Woerner Field at Time Warner Cable Stadium is a baseball field located on the campus of the University of Dayton in Dayton, Ohio, United States.  The field is home to the Dayton Flyers baseball team of the Division I Atlantic 10 Conference.  The field holds a capacity of 500 seated fans.

Construction
Construction of the facility was originally scheduled to begin after the end of the 2005 season.  However, unrelated construction needs of the university necessitated the stadium's construction to begin in the summer of 2003, as the location of Stuart Field (Dayton baseball's former on-campus home) was needed for development.  In summer 2004, the field itself, along with dugouts and a backstop, was constructed.  Lighting and stadium seating were not added until after the 2004 seating.  As a result, the Flyers did not play any home night games in 2004 and used temporary seating structures.  The Flyers posted an 11–14 home record in 2004.

Following the 2004 season, batting cages, permanent seating structures, restrooms, and concessions were added to complete the stadium.  The stadium was dedicated on May 7, 2005. The final construction cost estimate for the field was placed at $4 million.

Naming
From 2004 to 2011, the venue was known simply as Time Warner Cable Stadium, for Time Warner Cable, Inc.  On May 6, 2011, prior to a game against Xavier, the field was dedicated to former Dayton baseball player and university donor Larry Woerner.

Dayton home records
The following is a list of Flyers home records since the team began playing at Time Warner Cable Stadium in the 2004 season.

See also
 List of NCAA Division I baseball venues

References

College baseball venues in the United States
Baseball venues in Ohio
Dayton Flyers baseball
2004 establishments in Ohio
Sports venues completed in 2004
Sports venues in Dayton, Ohio